Prionofrontia is a genus of moths of the family Erebidae. The genus was erected by George Hampson in 1902.

Species
Prionofrontia erygidia Hampson, 1902
Prionofrontia nyctiscia Hampson, 1926
Prionofrontia ochrosia Hampson, 1926
Prionofrontia strigata Hampson, 1926

References

Calpinae